There are multiple waterfalls in the basin of the North Fork Cascade River, a river in the North Cascades of Washington that drains to the Cascade River.  Many of these are taller than the more famous waterfalls in North America, but do not receive much attention due to their remoteness.

Main waterfalls

Boston Creek Falls

Its most prominent tier is a  veil visible from the road, and a  section of the falls is also in view from the road.

Torment Falls

Torment Falls, although similar in fashion to Boston Creek Falls, is steeper and often more impressive. Like Boston Creek Falls, the falls is mostly obscured due to its gently sloping nature, and is only partially visible from the road.

Roush Creek Falls

Roush Creek Falls is a tall and powerful waterfall that cascades off the Eldorado Glacier. The falls skip down the valley wall in several strands, before turning into a more vertical waterfall and pouring into the North Fork.

Johannesburg Falls

In overall height, it is the 19th tallest waterfall in the world.

Other waterfalls

Known waterfalls

Obscure waterfalls
Midas Creek Falls, at 
Hidden Lake Falls, at 
Cascade Basin Falls, at

References

Waterfalls of Washington (state)
North Cascades of Washington (state)
Landforms of Skagit County, Washington